The 2000 Lehigh Mountain Hawks football team was an American football team that represented Lehigh University during the 2000 NCAA Division I-AA football season. Lehigh won its third consecutive Patriot League championship. 

In their seventh year under head coach Kevin Higgins, the Mountain Hawks went undefeated (11–0) in the regular season, ending the year at 12–1 after losing in the second round of the national playoffs. Matt Andrews, Bryant Appling, Dustin Grande and Brian McDonald were the team captains.

Including playoff games, the Mountain Hawks outscored opponents 337 to 160. Their 6–0 conference record topped the seven-team Patriot League standings. 

Lehigh was ranked No. 24 in the preseason national Division I-AA poll, but dropped out of the top 25 before its first game. After that opening win, the Mountain Hawks re-entered the rankings at No. 21 and steadily climbed to No. 8, where they ended the year.

Despite their conference championship and undefeated record, Lehigh did not host any playoff games. The Mountain Hawks defeated No. 6 Western Illinois and then lost to a familiar foe, No. 3 Delaware, on the road.

Lehigh played its home games at Goodman Stadium on the university's Goodman Campus in Bethlehem, Pennsylvania.

Schedule

References

Lehigh
Lehigh Mountain Hawks football seasons
Patriot League football champion seasons
Lehigh Mountain Hawks football